Tulipa agenensis is a Middle Eastern species of flowering plant in the family Liliaceae. It is native to Turkey, Iran, Cyprus, the Aegean Islands, Syria, Lebanon, Israel, Jordan, and Palestine, and naturalized in the central and western Mediterranean (Italy, Tunisia, France, Portugal, Moldova etc.).

Tulipa agenensis is a bulb-forming perennial. The flowers are brick red or deep red with black and yellow markings toward the center with a green stem. The petals are oval, tapered with curled tips and it has green and lanceolate foliage.

Taxonomy
In Italy, it was commonly known as the 'Red Tulip of Bologne'.

The specific epithet agenensis, refers to the French town of Agen, where a wild colony of the tulips were found. 

T. agenensis was originally described and published by Pierre-Joseph Redouté in his painted series 'Les Liliacées' Vol.1 in February 1804.

Culture
A painting by the Dutch artist Jacob de Gheyn II, 'Vase of Flowers with a Curtain' in 1615, has several tulips including a hybrid Tulipa hungarica crossed with Tulipa agenensis. While Osias Beert I painting Flowers in a glass vase in a niche (undated but c.1606), also has several tulips including the Red tulip, Tulipa agenensis.

Gallery

References

External links
Flowers in Israel, Tulipa agenensis, Tulipa oculis-solis, Tulipa sharonensis, Sharon tulip, Sun's-eye tulip, Hebrew: צבעוני ההרים, Arabic: زنبق, قرن الغزالزنبق, قرن الغزال  in English with color photos
Flowering Jordan, Tulipa agenensis  color photos
Tulipa agenensis - Cyprus - (Cyprus Red Data Book)  YouTube video
Pacific Bulb Society, Tulipa Species One photos of several species including Tulipa agenensis

agenensis
Ephemeral plants
Plants described in 1804